Giramangu, also known as Gaira Mangue or Mangyu, is a village in the Leh district of Ladakh, India. It is located in the Likir tehsil. The Mangyu temple complex (Mangyu monastery) is located near this village.

Demographics
According to the 2011 census of India, Giramangu has 67 households. The effective literacy rate (i.e. the literacy rate of population excluding children aged 6 and below) is 65.56%.

References 

Villages in Likir tehsil